The Arkansas Razorbacks college football team represents the University of Arkansas in the West Division of the Southeastern Conference (SEC). The Razorbacks compete as part of the NCAA Division I Football Bowl Subdivision. The program has had 33 head coaches, and 3 interim head coaches, since it began play during the 1894 season. The Razorbacks' current head coach is Sam Pittman, who has held the position since the start of the 2020 season.

As of the conclusion of the 2019 regular season, the team has played 1,271 games over 126 seasons. In that time, twelve coaches have led the Razorbacks in postseason bowl games: Fred Thomsen, John Barnhill, Bowden Wyatt, Frank Broyles, Lou Holtz, Ken Hatfield, Jack Crowe, Danny Ford, Houston Nutt, Reggie Herring, Bobby Petrino, and Bret Bielema. Five coaches won conference championships: Thomsen, Wyatt, Broyles, Holtz and Hatfield won a combined ten as a member of the Southwest Conference. Frank Broyles won the Razorbacks' lone national championship in 1964.

Broyles is the leader in seasons coached and games won, with 144 victories during his 19 years with the program. Hatfield has the highest winning percentage of those who have coached more than one game, with .760. Chad Morris has the lowest winning percentage of those who have coached more than one game, with .182. Of the 31 different head coaches who have led the Razorbacks, Hugo Bezdek, Francis Schmidt, Wyatt, Broyles, and Holtz have been inducted as head coaches into the College Football Hall of Fame in Atlanta, Georgia.

Key

Coaches

Notes

References 
General

 
 

Specific

Arkansas

Arkansas Razorbacks football coaches